Borroloola Airport  is an airport located approximately  south of Borroloola in the Northern Territory, Australia.

Facilities and operations
Portable runway lighting is available for emergency operation at night. Due to its remote location, air traffic is infrequent and there is no control tower. Pilots co-ordinate takeoffs and landings using a Common Traffic Advisory Frequency. There is a Non-Directional Beacon radio navigation aid located close to the airport. Fuel is available by arrangement with the ground handling agent. The terminal facilities consist of a basic waiting shelter and a public toilet.

There are currently no airlines or scheduled passenger flights serving Borroloola however several charter companies offer flights to the airport, including Katherine Aviation who have a pilot and Cessna aircraft permanently based at the airport to operate on demand charter flights to Katherine and other communities, and scenic flights to the nearby Sir Edward Pellew Islands and surrounding attractions. There is also a twice weekly mail plane from Katherine and the airstrip is available 24 hours a day for medical evacuation flights.

Accidents and incidents
 On 31 November 1987 a Cessna 172 was stolen from Borroloola airport after the engine was started using the frame from a pair of sunglasses. During takeoff, the tail of the aircraft struck the runway and an attempt to correct this by reducing power led to the aircraft's nosewheel striking the ground. It then ran off the runway and came to rest upside down. The person at the controls had never undertaken formal flight training or held a pilots licence.

See also
List of airports in the Northern Territory

References

Airports in the Northern Territory